Chelymorpha is a genus of tortoise beetles and hispines in the family Chrysomelidae. There are more than 70 described species in Chelymorpha.

Species
These 71 species belong to the genus Chelymorpha:

 Chelymorpha aculeata Borowiec, 2000
 Chelymorpha adnata (Boheman, 1854)
 Chelymorpha adspersula Boheman, 1862
 Chelymorpha advena Boheman, 1856
 Chelymorpha alternans Boheman, 1854
 Chelymorpha andicola Spaeth, 1928
 Chelymorpha areata (Erichson, 1847)
 Chelymorpha atomaria Boheman, 1854
 Chelymorpha atrocincta Spaeth, 1926
 Chelymorpha binotata (Fabricius, 1792)
 Chelymorpha bituberculata (Fabricius, 1787)
 Chelymorpha bivulnerata Spaeth, 1909
 Chelymorpha boliviana Boheman, 1854
 Chelymorpha bullata Boheman, 1854
 Chelymorpha calva Boheman, 1854
 Chelymorpha cassidea (Fabricius, 1775) (Argus tortoise beetle)
 Chelymorpha cavata Boheman, 1854
 Chelymorpha cingulata Boheman, 1854
 Chelymorpha circumpunctata (Klug, 1829)
 Chelymorpha clathrata Spaeth, 1909
 Chelymorpha clivosa Boheman, 1854
 Chelymorpha cobaltina Boheman, 1854
 Chelymorpha comata Boheman, 1854
 Chelymorpha commutabilis Boheman, 1854
 Chelymorpha constellata (Klug, 1829)
 Chelymorpha costaricensis (Spaeth, 1922)
 Chelymorpha cribraria (Fabricius, 1775)
 Chelymorpha gressoria Boheman, 1862
 Chelymorpha haematura Boheman, 1854
 Chelymorpha hoepfneri Boheman, 1854
 Chelymorpha indigesta Boheman, 1854
 Chelymorpha infecta Boheman, 1854
 Chelymorpha infirma Boheman, 1854
 Chelymorpha inflata Boheman, 1854
 Chelymorpha insignis (Klug, 1829)
 Chelymorpha klugii Boheman, 1854
 Chelymorpha limbatipennis Spaeth, 1926
 Chelymorpha marginata (Linnaeus, 1758)
 Chelymorpha militaris Boheman, 1862
 Chelymorpha multipicta Boheman, 1862
 Chelymorpha multipunctata Olivier, 1790
 Chelymorpha nigricollis Boheman, 1854
 Chelymorpha orthogonia Boheman, 1854
 Chelymorpha pacifica Boheman, 1854
 Chelymorpha partita Boheman, 1854
 Chelymorpha peregrina Boheman, 1854
 Chelymorpha personata Boheman, 1854
 Chelymorpha peruana Spaeth, 1902
 Chelymorpha phytophagica Crotch, 1873
 Chelymorpha polyspilota Burmeister, 1870
 Chelymorpha praetextata Boheman, 1854
 Chelymorpha pubescens Boheman, 1854
 Chelymorpha punctatissima Spaeth, 1937
 Chelymorpha punctigera Boheman, 1854
 Chelymorpha reimoseri Spaeth, 1928
 Chelymorpha rosarioensis Buzzi, 2000
 Chelymorpha rufoguttata Spaeth, 1909
 Chelymorpha rugicollis Champion, 1893
 Chelymorpha sericea Boheman, 1862
 Chelymorpha socia Boheman, 1854
 Chelymorpha sturmii Boheman, 1854
 Chelymorpha stygia Boheman, 1862
 Chelymorpha subpunctata Boheman, 1854
 Chelymorpha tessellata Spaeth, 1928
 Chelymorpha texta Boheman, 1862
 Chelymorpha trinitatis Spaeth, 1926
 Chelymorpha varians (Blanchard, 1851)
 Chelymorpha variolosa (Olivier, 1790)
 Chelymorpha vermiculata Boheman, 1854
 Chelymorpha vittifera (Spaeth, 1932)
 Chelymorpha wollastoni Boheman, 1854

References

Further reading

External links

 

Cassidinae
Articles created by Qbugbot